Milwaukee Magazine is a monthly city magazine serving the Milwaukee metropolitan area in Wisconsin, United States. It bills itself as "Southeastern Wisconsin's most authoritative source for Events and Dining," and reports a readership of 200,000.

History and profile
A magazine named Milwaukee (sometimes Milwaukee, the metropolitan magazine) was established in 1977, and its final edition (volume 8, issue 4) was published in May 1983.  It was continued by Milwaukee Magazine, which designated its first edition, published in June 1983, as volume 8, issue 5. Its office is located in the Historic Third Ward neighborhood of downtown Milwaukee. It is printed by its parent company, Quad, and is a member of the City and Regional Magazine Association (CRMA). The magazine is the recipient of various awards for its design and editorials.

References

External links
Milwaukee Magazine website

1983 establishments in Wisconsin
Monthly magazines published in the United States
News magazines published in the United States
City guides
Local interest magazines published in the United States
Magazines established in 1983
Magazines published in Wisconsin
Mass media in Milwaukee